Malia O Ka Malu or Our Lady of Peace is an appellation of the Blessed Virgin Mary in the Hawaiian language. It is shortened from "Malia o ka Malu Hale Pule Nui", a title of the mother church of the Roman Catholic Diocese of Honolulu, the Cathedral of Our Lady of Peace.

Background
Other Hawaiian churches honoring the Virgin include
 Maria Lanakila, Our Lady of Victory, in Lahaina
 Malia Hoku O Ke Kai, Mary the Star of the Sea, in Kahala
 Malia Puka O Ka Lani, Mary the Gate of Heaven, in Hilo

References 

Catholic Church in Hawaii
Hawaiian language
Titles of Mary
Catholic Church in the United States